David Carlsson (born 28 June 1983) is a Swedish bandy player who currently plays for Vetlanda BK as midfielder.  David is a youth product of Nävelsjö SK.

Carlsson has only played for two clubs-
 Nävelsjö SK (2003-2006)
 Vetlanda BK (2006-)

External links
 David Carlsson at bandysidan
 Vetlanda BK

Swedish bandy players
Living people
1983 births
Vetlanda BK players
Place of birth missing (living people)